The Spartacist League was a small Trotskyist political party in Sweden.  It was a member of the international Spartacist tendency (iSt).

The League consisted of a small nucleus of supporters, from the late 1970s until the early 1980s. The members of that group are today found in other Trotskyist groups in Sweden or remain active in other League sections. Robert Malecki was a Swedish supporter of the League, publishing the magazine Cockroach as well as some books and brochures on his website.

Defunct communist parties in Sweden
Sweden
Political parties with year of disestablishment missing
Political parties with year of establishment missing
Trotskyist organizations in Sweden